Dulip Prasanna Samaraweera (born 12 February 1972) is a former Sri Lankan cricketer who played in seven Test matches and five One Day Internationals for his country from 1993 to 1995. He was a right-handed opening batsmen and occasional right arm off-spinner.

Family
His younger brother Thilan Samaraweera is also a former Test, ODI and T20I player of the Sri Lankan national cricket team.

His brother in law Bathiya Perera is also a former first class cricketer of Sri Lanka.

Domestic career
Playing for the Colts Cricket Club in Sri Lanka, Samaraweera made his first class debut in the 1991-92 season. He made his Twenty20 debut on 17 August 2004, for Colts Cricket Club in the 2004 SLC Twenty20 Tournament.

He continued his first-class career for Colts until retiring in 2003. A strike rate of 53 in ODIs and 26 in Tests indicated that he was a dour player who did not score quickly. Although he never bowled at international level, he had 41 wickets to his name at first class level with an excellent average of 20. He scored over 7000 runs at first-class level including 16 centuries and 34 half centuries but never established himself at international level.

International career
He was selected for the ODI team for his debut against the West Indies in Sharjah in November 1993, in which he only managed three runs. He played four more times, aggregating 91 runs and making his top-scoring of 49 in a successful run-chase against India in Jalandhar in early 1994. Despite top-scoring, he never played ODIs for Sri Lanka again.

He made his Test debut against the West Indies at Moratuwa in December 1993, after replacing Chandika Hathurusingha as an opener. He made a slow 16 from 107 balls on debut. He made his top score of 42 in his next Test against India in Lucknow and played the whole India series, before touring New Zealand in early 1995 when he played his final two Test matches. He was dropped, ending his international career, in which he failed to pass 50 in any of his 14 innings.

References

1972 births
Living people
Alumni of Ananda College
Sri Lanka Test cricketers
Sri Lanka One Day International cricketers
Sri Lankan cricketers
Basnahira North cricketers
Basnahira South cricketers
Colts Cricket Club cricketers